The Center for Wooden Boats (CWB) is a museum dedicated to preserving and documenting the maritime history of the Pacific Northwest area of the United States. CWB was founded by Dick Wagner in Seattle in the 1970s and has grown to include three sites; the South Lake Union campus in Lake Union Park, the Northlake Workshop & Warehouse at the  orth end of Lake Union, and The Center for Wooden Boats at Cama Beach State Park on Camano Island.

Collection 

The CWB collection includes more than 170 vessels, mostly small sailboats and rowboats. The boats are divided into a number of sections. The livery fleet includes daysailers, rowboats, and two pedal boats.

The  Blanchard Junior Knockabout is the mainstay of CWB's rental fleet. These boats were designed and built at the Blanchard Boat Company on Lake Union. They have eight, which are used for teaching and rentals.

See also 
Lake Union Park
Lake Union
List of maritime museums in the United States
Myrtle Edwards Park (Other end of Broad Street)

References

External links

Pacific Northwest Maritime Heritage Council Online Search Tool, an online directory of maritime heritage attractions and organizations in the Pacific Northwest.
Historic American Engineering Record (HAER) documentation, filed under Center for Wooden Boats, Seattle, King County, WA:

Historic American Engineering Record in Washington (state)
Museums in Seattle
Maritime museums in Washington (state)
South Lake Union, Seattle